The Ai Noa (Hawaiian: literally free eating), was a period of taboo-breaking which convulsed the Hawaiian Islands in October 1819. Women were allowed to eat forbidden food and to eat with men; the priests were no longer to offer human sacrifices; the many prohibitions surrounding the high chiefs were relaxed. 

Kamehameha I, the conqueror of the islands, had just died; his son Liholiho succeeded him (and was later known as King Kamehameha II). He came to power amid scenes of grief and licence. 

The usually strict rules of the Hawaiian religion and social system, known as kapu, were in abeyance during the usual mourning period. Women ate pork and bananas, people had sexual intercourse with whomever they pleased, routine life was completely overthrown. When a new high chief came to power, he usually re-imposed the kapu. 

Liholiho did attempt to reestablish the kapu, but he was opposed by his mother, Keōpūolani, the other wives of Kamehameha (including Kaahumanu, the powerful Maui chiefess), and Hewahewa, the Kahuna-nui of the kingdom. He took refuge in his canoe and after sailing about aimlessly for two days on the west coast of the Big Island of Hawaii, he landed and ate the feast of dogmeat (ordinarily reserved for women) that the chiefesses had prepared for him. Messengers were then sent over the islands announcing that eating was free and the kapu had fallen.
The downfall of the old religion was further hastened by the arrival of Christian missionaries a few months later.

References

Primary sources

Secondary sources 

Hawaiian Kingdom
Taboo
Hawaiian religion